Cymindis davatchii is a species of ground beetle in the subfamily Harpalinae. It was described by Morvan in 1975.

References

davatchii
Beetles described in 1975